This is a list of events in Scottish television from 2009.

Events

January
No events.

February
No events.

March
20 March – STV North's regional news programme North Tonight ends after 29 years on air.
22 March – STV Central's regional news programme Scotland Today ends after 37 years on air.
23 March – Launch of the new look news programme STV News at Six in STV's North and Central regions.

April
No events.

May
No events.

June
No events.

July
July – The BBC Trust writes to the UK government asking for it to guarantee that future Scotland football internationals are broadcast on terrestrial television.
July – Launch of STV Player allowing Internet users to view STV programmes online.
July – STV announces that it is withdrawing some ITV1 networked programmes such as The Bill, Doc Martin, Midsomer Murders, Poirot and Lewis from its schedules, instead preferring to concentrate on programming made within Scotland.

August
28 August – At the Edinburgh International Television Festival News Corporation Chairman James Murdoch delivers the MacTaggart Memorial Lecture in which he launches an attack on the BBC and UK media regulator Ofcom.

September
22 September – ITV plc launches legal proceedings against STV for a quoted unpaid debt of £38 million from network programming contributions, following STV's practice of dropping a number of network programmes on the STV franchise. At the same time, STV claims it is also following procedures against ITV plc, for up to £40 million owed to STV under its advertising sales agreements.

October
26 October – The BBC Trust announces a review of the Gaelic language channel BBC Alba to assess its impact on viewers.

November
No events.

December
No events.

Debuts

BBC
22 March – Sport Nation on BBC Two (2009–present)
21 October – Gary: Tank Commander (2009–2012)

ITV
17 January – wknd@stv (2009)
23 March – STV News at Six (2009–present)
6 September – STV Rugby (2009–2010; 2011–present)

Television series
Reporting Scotland (1968–1983; 1984–present)
Sportscene (1975–present)
The Beechgrove Garden (1978–present)
Taggart (1983–2010)
Only an Excuse? (1993–2020)
River City (2002–present)
Politics Now (2004–2011)
The Adventure Show (2005–present)
GMTV Scotland (2007–present)
Trusadh (2008–present)

Ending this year
20 March – North Tonight (1980–2009)
22 March – Scotland Today (1972–2009)

Deaths
30 April – Maurice Lindsay, 91, broadcaster
15 September – Troy Kennedy Martin, 77, screenwriter

See also
2009 in Scotland

References

 
Television in Scotland by year
2000s in Scottish television